Mehrian or Mehreyan or Mehriyan may refer to:
 Mehrian, Arsanjan, Fars Province
 Mehrian, Shiraz, Fars Province
 Mehrian, Kohgiluyeh and Boyer-Ahmad